The men's 400 metres hurdles at the 2013 World Championships in Athletics was held at the Luzhniki Stadium on 12–15 August.

In the second semifinal, it took Emir Bekrić a new Serbian national record to get the second automatic qualifier behind Michael Tinsley.  The third semifinal was fast, with the now 35-year-old double Olympic and World Champion Félix Sánchez chasing Omar Cisneros' new world leading time.  "The Dictator's" 48.10 season best took the Masters M35 world record from Danny McFarlane.

In the final Kerron Clement was out like a rocket, first over the first barrier, but long strides in lane one don't usually work out.  Down the backstretch Tinsley asserted himself and by the fifth hurdle was clearly the leader with Cisneros the next in line.  At the back were Bekrić and Sanchez.  Through the turn Javier Culson then Jehue Gordon tried to make up ground on Tinsley.  Gordon broke away and passed Tinsley over the last hurdle with the momentum.  Going into the line it looked like Gordon had the step but Tinsley worked his way back into first.  In one of the best dives of modern time, Gordon snatched the win, then one step later falling to the track.  Bekrić might have been the fastest finisher, coming from fifth place to third on the final straight setting a second national record at 48.05

Records
Prior to the competition, the records were as follows:

Qualification standards

Schedule

Results

Heats
Qualification: First 4 in each heat (Q) and the next 4 fastest (q) advanced to the semifinals.

Semifinals
Qualification: First 2 in each heat (Q) and the next 2 fastest (q) advanced to the final.

Final
The final was started at 21:00.

References

External links
400 metres hurdles results at IAAF website

400mh
400 metres hurdles at the World Athletics Championships